Valadzko is a Belarusian language surname, the equivalent of Polish Wołodko. Notable people with this surname include:
Alyaksandr Valadzko (born 1986), Belarusian footballer of Polish descent
Maksim Valadzko (born 1992), Belarusian footballer
Siarhei Valadzko (born 1992), Belarusian rower

See also
 

Belarusian-language surnames